The 2019 Auckland mayoral election was held on 12 October 2019 to determine who would serve as Mayor of Auckland for the next three years. Nominations opened on 19 July 2019 and closed on 16 August 2019. Incumbent Mayor Phil Goff won the election with 48% of the vote to secure a second term.

Background 
Phil Goff was the incumbent mayor of Auckland. Goff became mayor at the 2016 election in which the previous mayor, Len Brown, did not stand. Goff announced in March 2019 that he would stand again.

The election was conducted by postal vote, and used the first past the post vote system.

Key dates
Key dates for the election were:

1 July: Electoral Commission enrolment campaign began.
19 July: Nominations opened for candidates. Rolls opened for inspection.
16 August: Nominations closed at 12 noon. Rolls closed.
21 August: Election date and candidates' names announced.
20 to 25 September: Voting documents delivered to households. Electors could post the documents back to electoral officers as soon as they had voted.
12 October: Polling day. Voting documents had to be at council before voting closed at 12 noon. Preliminary results were to be available as soon as all ordinary votes were counted.
17 to 23 October: Official results, including all valid ordinary and special votes, declared.

Candidates
The 21 candidates for the mayoralty were:

Prospective candidates who did not stand
The following people indicated they might, or would, run for mayor in this election, but ultimately did not.
Mike Lee, councillor
John Lehmann, president of the Government Accountability League – announced intention to run but did not appear in the list of candidates when nominations closed
Joshua Love, hospitality entrepreneur – announced intention to run but did not appear in the list of candidates when nominations closed
Simon O'Connor, MP for Tamaki
John Palino, restaurateur and 2013 and 2016 candidate – announced intention to run on 25 November 2018 but withdrew on 12 August 2019, intending to run for Auckland Council instead.

Policies and campaigning 
The campaign included a number of debates. One debate between Goff, Tamihere, Lord, and Henry discussed issues such as infrastructure, public transport, climate change, parking, and inequality, among other topics. The last debate was on 1 October. Candidate Phil Goff compared the campaign to the previous one saying: "It's a lot different from last time, we had a lot of meetings last time, it's been a more aggressive campaign from his [John Tamihere's] side."

Candidate John Tamihere faced controversy for using the term "Sieg Heil" during a debate. After Goff stated "We won't put up with the sort of nonsense that we get from racists coming into this country to tell us that multiculturalism doesn't work," Tamihere responded, "I say sieg heil to that." After the debate, Tamihere initially denied using the term, then stated his comments were a criticism of Goff's actions around a decision to bar controversial Canadian speakers Stefan Molyneux and Lauren Southern from using an Auckland Council venue in 2018, calling Goff "a dictator".

Tamihere made a complaint over three social media posts posted by Phil Goff, but the complaints were rejected by the Advertising Standards Authority.

Some voting booklets contained two incorrect photographs, including showing mayoral candidate Tricia Cheel as a man.

Endorsements
Phil Goff
New Zealand Labour Party – political party
David Tua – professional boxer

John Tamihere
Christine Fletcher – current councillor
John Banks – former Mayor of Auckland City

Results

By local board

Source:

Turnout 
Turnout was expected to be lower than in previous elections. Initial counts, while voting was still open, showed turnout to be lower compared with the same time in the 2016 election. The final turnout for Auckland was predicted to be around 35%.

See also
2019 Auckland local elections

Notes

References

Mayoral elections in Auckland
Auckland Council
2019 elections in New Zealand
2010s in Auckland
October 2019 events in New Zealand